Rohit Sharma, is an Indian cricketer who plays for India.

Rohit Sharma may also refer to:

Rohit Sharma (cricketer, born 1993), Indian cricketer who plays for Haryana
Rohit Sharma (cricketer, born 1994), Indian cricketer who plays for Jammu & Kashmir
Rohit Sharma (cricketer, born 1983), Indian cricketer who plays for Rajasthan
Rohit Sharma (cricketer, born 1968), Indian cricketer who plays for Uttar Pradesh
Rohit Sharma (composer), Indian film-composer
Rohit Sharma (politician), Fijian politician